"Medicine" is the first promo single of American hip hop recording artist Plies' fourth studio album, Goon Affiliated. The track is absent from the retail versions for unknown reasons, but is on the Amazon deluxe version. The hip hop track features American singer-songwriter Keri Hilson. There are two versions, one with a more radio friendly, slow beat and one with a more club beat.

The original version of the song was by Three 6 Mafia ft. Gucci Mane & Keri Hilson under the same title. The tempo is somewhat slower in that version.

The song contains a sample of "Ex fan des sixties" by Jane Birkin and composed by French singer and songwriter Serge Gainsbourg.

Music video

A music video was shot for the song and premiered on January 14, 2010. It takes place in a hospital where Keri Hilson plays a nurse and Plies is the doctor which makes reference to the song. Myammee from VH1 also makes a cameo in the beginning of the video.

Chart performance

References

2009 singles
Plies (rapper) songs
Keri Hilson songs
Song recordings produced by Polow da Don
Songs written by Keri Hilson
Songs written by Plies (rapper)
2009 songs